Timothy Ayres (born 18 December 1973) is an Australian politician and trade unionist who was elected as a Senator for New South Wales at the 2019 federal election. He is a member of the Australian Labor Party and was previously a trade union official with the Australian Manufacturing Workers' Union (AMWU).

Early life
Ayres was born in Sydney on 18 December 1973. He was raised on a farm near Lismore, New South Wales. He completed his schooling at Glen Innes High School, before going on to study industrial relations at the University of Sydney.

Career
Ayres worked as a union organiser in the Riverina until 2000, when he moved to Sydney. He was elected state secretary of the Australian Manufacturing Workers' Union (AMWU) in 2010. 

In July 2017, Ayres won preselection for the ALP Senate ticket in New South Wales, replacing retiring senator Doug Cameron. He defeated former federal MP Chris Haviland by a substantial margin in a ballot of Labor Left factional delegates. According to The Australian, the vote was "highly controversial and acrimonious", and was boycotted by two major left-wing unions, the Maritime Union of Australia and the CFMEU. 

Ayres was elected to the Senate at the 2019 federal election, running in second place on the ALP ticket in New South Wales. He made his first speech to parliament on 30 July 2019, in which he offered that "a cruel pea-heart beats inside the chest of this mean-spirited government".

In 2022, following the ALP's victory at the 2022 federal election, Ayres was appointed assistant trade minister in the Albanese government.

References

External links
 

Australian Labor Party members of the Parliament of Australia
Labor Left politicians
Members of the Australian Senate for New South Wales
1973 births
Living people
Australian trade unionists
University of Sydney alumni